Clarklewis is a restaurant in Portland, Oregon, United States.

Description
Clarklewis serves Italian-inspired Pacific Northwest cuisine in an industrial space in southeast Portland's Buckman neighborhood. The menu has included Cortez Bay scallop ceviche, Pacific halibut with pancetta, chicken and Mulino Marino polenta, and orecchiette with gold potatoes, green beans, and pesto, among other pasta dishes. The restaurant has used meat from the bison ranch Rain Shadow El Rancho in Scio, Oregon.

History

Michael and Naomi Hebberoy were co-owners, as of 2005. Morgan Brownlow was a chef. Daniel Mattern and Roxana Jullapat were chefs during 2007–2008. Kyo Koo has the sous chef for three years, as of 2011. Dolan Lane was a chef as during 2011–2012, and became chef of Bluehour in January 2013. Lane has also been credited as a co-owner of Clarklewis via Bruce Carey's restaurant group, from which he departed in 2014.

In 2018, sous-chef Brandon Stein replaced chef Alex Diestra and Brandi Lansill was hired as the pastry chef.

Clarklewis added the private dining space, called The Kindling Room, in 2010. The restaurant hosts an annual outdoor Independence Day celebration ("Outdoor American Dinner and Fireworks Party"). In 2014, a woman filed a lawsuit again the restaurant after tripping over a wooden stump used as a doorstop. Clarklewis installed a nearby rooftop garden for produce production in 2015.

See also

 List of Pacific Northwest restaurants

References

External links

 
 Clarklewis at Fodor's
 Clarklewis at Travel + Leisure
 Clarklewis at Zomato

Buckman, Portland, Oregon
Pacific Northwest restaurants in Oregon
Restaurants in Portland, Oregon